Acrocercops fuscapica is a moth of the family Gracillariidae. It is known from Nigeria.

References

Endemic fauna of Nigeria
fuscapica
Moths of Africa
Moths described in 1980
Insects of West Africa